Kris McQuade (born 1952) is an Australian actress who has had many film, television and theatre roles.

Career
Her film credits include The Love Letters from Teralba Road, Kostas, Fighting Back, Lonely Hearts, Goodbye Paradise, The Coca-Cola Kid, Strictly Ballroom, Billy's Holiday, December Boys and Cargo.

McQuade's television credits include episodes of Fields of Flame, Fields of Fire, Scales of Justice, Palace of Dreams, Certain Women, Skyways, Punishment, A Country Practice, Home and Away, The Flying Doctors, Boys From The Bush, Love Thy Neighbour in Australia, The Last Resort (1988), Wildside, Grass Roots, Blue Heelers, Stingers, Supernova, Wentworth, The Kettering Incident, and Rosehaven.

McQuade joined the filming for Wentworth in late 2012 as crime matriarch Jacs Holt, McQuade would feature in the entire first season of the show before the character was killed during the finale.

Mcquade joined the cast of Rosehaven in the role of Barbara for the shows entire run.

Filmography

Film

Television

References

External links
 

1952 births
Living people
Australian film actresses
Australian television actresses
Best Supporting Actress AACTA Award winners
20th-century Australian actresses
21st-century Australian actresses